Osvaldo Rodríguez del Portal (born 10 September 1996) is a Mexican professional footballer who plays as a left-back for Liga MX club León.

International career
On 12 June 2021, Rodríguez made his senior national team debut in a friendly match against Honduras. He was then selected for the 2021 CONCACAF Gold Cup squad, where he appeared in 3 games, including the final loss to the United States, in which he came on as a substitute for extra time.

Career statistics

Club

International

International goals
Scores and results list Mexico's goal tally first.

Honours
Pachuca
Liga MX: Clausura 2016

León
Liga MX: Guardianes 2020
Leagues Cup: 2021

Mexico U17
FIFA U-17 World Cup runner-up: 2013

References

External links
 

1996 births
Living people
Mexico youth international footballers
Mexico international footballers
Association football defenders
C.F. Pachuca players
Club León footballers
Liga MX players
Liga Premier de México players
Footballers from San Luis Potosí
People from San Luis Potosí City
2021 CONCACAF Gold Cup players
Mexican footballers